Marion Ross (born Marian Ellen Ross; October 25, 1928) is an American actress. Her best-known role is that of Marion Cunningham on the ABC television sitcom Happy Days, on which she starred from 1974 to 1984 and for which she received two Primetime Emmy Award nominations. Before her success on Happy Days, Ross appeared in a variety of film roles, appearing in The Glenn Miller Story (1954), Sabrina (1954), Lust for Life (1956), Teacher's Pet (1958), Some Came Running (1958), Operation Petticoat (1959), and Honky (1971), as well as several minor television roles, one of which was on television's The Lone Ranger (1954). She was also twice nominated successively in 1992 and 1993 for the Primetime Emmy Award for her performance on the CBS television comedy-drama Brooklyn Bridge and later netted another Emmy nomination (her fifth and last) in 1999 for a two-episode appearance on the popular CBS drama Touched by an Angel. Ross also starred in the high-profile, long-anticipated sequel to Terms of Endearment (1983), The Evening Star (1996), in a turn for which she was nominated for the Golden Globe Award for Best Supporting Actress, as well as both a nomination and win for a Lone Star Film and Television Award for Best Supporting Actress.

Since the 1990s, Ross has been known for voice-over work on animated television series, including King of the Hill and SpongeBob SquarePants, among others, and recurring roles on The Drew Carey Show, Gilmore Girls, and Brothers & Sisters and guest appearances.

Early life
Ross was born on October 25, 1928, in Watertown, Carver County, Minnesota, the daughter of Gordon and Ellen (née Hamilton) Ross, natives of Saskatchewan, Canada. She lived in Waconia, then moved to Willmar, and eventually to Albert Lea, Minnesota. 

At the age of 13, she changed the spelling of her name from "Marian" to "Marion" because she thought it would look better on a marquee. After completing her sophomore year in high school, she moved to Minneapolis, studying drama at the MacPhail Center for Music and attending Southwest High School. A year later, her family moved to San Diego, California. She graduated from Point Loma High School in San Diego.

Ross received her undergraduate degree from San Diego State University.

Career

Early film and television roles: 1953–73
Ross made her 1953 film debut in Forever Female, starring Ginger Rogers and William Holden. She found steady work in film, appearing in The Glenn Miller Story (1954), Sabrina (1954), Lust for Life (1956), Lizzie (1957), Teacher's Pet (1958), Some Came Running (1958), and Operation Petticoat (1959). She also appeared in Colossus: The Forbin Project (1970), Honky (1971), and Grand Theft Auto (1977).

Ross' career on television also began in 1953, when she played the Irish maid on the series Life with Father for two years. In 1954, she appeared as Ginny Thorpe on The Lone Ranger, and in 1958, she appeared on NBC's Mickey Spillane's Mike Hammer as Mary Williams. In 1959, she appeared as a teacher Miss McGinnis on ABC's The Donna Reed Show.

Ross also appeared on The George Burns and Gracie Allen Show, The Millionaire (1956 episode), Steve Canyon, Perry Mason (The Case of the Romantic Rogue), Buckskin, The Barbara Stanwyck Show, Father Knows Best, The Outer Limits (The Special One), Thriller (U.S. TV series) (The Prisoner in the Mirror), The Brothers Brannagan (two episodes as Diane Warren), The Eleventh Hour, Mannix, Route 66, Mr. Novak, Death Valley Days, Hawaii Five-O, The Brady Bunch, The Fugitive, and Night Court.

In the 1961–62 television season, she played Gertrude Berg's daughter on the CBS sitcom Mrs. G. Goes to College as well as starred as a mail order bride on Rawhide. Ross had an uncredited and non-speaking role as one of the hapless passengers on board Trans Global Flight #2 in Airport (1970). That year, Ross played a computer scientist opposite Eric Braeden in the sci-fi thriller Colossus: The Forbin Project.

Happy Days success and roles thereafter: 1974–95

Ross' best known role is on the sitcom Happy Days, which aired for 11 seasons on ABC, from 1974 to 1984. She portrayed matriarch Marion Cunningham, mother of Richie, Joanie, and (briefly) Chuck. She received Primetime Emmy Award nominations for her work on the show in 1979 and 1984. Ross later reprised Marion Cunningham on the spin-off series Joanie Loves Chachi and on Family Guy.

Between 1978 and 1986, she appeared as different characters on The Love Boat. In the 1986–87 television season, Ross became a series regular, playing Emily Haywood. She later starred in the short-lived, critically acclaimed comedy-drama Brooklyn Bridge, which ran on CBS from 1991 to 1993. The series won a Golden Globe Award and was nominated for a Primetime Emmy Award following its first season. Ross also appeared on the game show Password Plus in 1979.

Recent roles: 1996–2021

In 1996, Ross starred as housekeeper Rosie Dunlop (played originally by Betty R. King in the preceding 1983 film), opposite Shirley MacLaine in The Evening Star, a sequel to Terms of Endearment. Despite panning the film, New York Times critic Janet Maslin enthused that, "Marion Ross does a warm, sturdy job as the devoted housekeeper who has been kept too long under Aurora's wing." She went on to be nominated for a 1997 Golden Globe Award for Best Supporting Actress for her performance, as well as going on to win the 1997 Lone Star Film and Television Award for Best Supporting Actress for that very same turn.

Ross had a recurring role on Touched by an Angel as a homeless woman and was in the final two episodes of the series. Additionally, she played a secretly ill mother  in "The Cat", an episode of Early Edition that first aired in April 1997. She had recurring roles as Drew Carey's mother on The Drew Carey Show (during one episode of which she was referred to as her Happy Days character Mrs. Cunningham, a deliberate error for a contest the show was running); as mean grandmother Bernice Forman on That '70s Show; and as Lorelai "Trix" Gilmore and Marilyn Gilmore on Gilmore Girls. She also frequently appeared on Hollywood Squares.

During the 1990s, Ross became active in voice-over work. She played Ms. Wakefield on the Fox animated series King of the Hill, Grandma SquarePants on Nickelodeon's SpongeBob SquarePants, Crane's mother on Kung Fu Panda: Legends of Awesomeness and Mrs. Lopart on Handy Manny. She also guest-starred on The Sylvester and Tweety Mysteries, The Wild Thornberrys, and Generator Rex.

In 2007, Ross appeared in Music Within. In 2007 and 2010, she played Ida Holden on ABC's Brothers & Sisters. In June 2008, the Albert Lea Civic Theater in Albert Lea, Minnesota, changed its name to the Marion Ross Performing Arts Center. That year, Ross played Aunt Lucille in the film Superhero Movie, and in 2009 she appeared in a guest spot on The New Adventures of Old Christine.

In 2010, Ross guest-starred on Nurse Jackie and Grey's Anatomy, and appeared in the Cartoon Network television film Scooby-Doo! Curse of the Lake Monster as Mrs. Trowburg. In 2013, she guest-starred on both Major Crimes and The Middle, and in 2014 on Two and a Half Men. In September 2015, she began making brief appearances on MeTV to share her memories of her Happy Days co-stars.

In 2021, Ross announced that she had officially retired from acting.  She has, however, continued to make several small appearances in various online projects.

Personal life

Ross lives in Cardiff by the Sea, a neighborhood of the city of Encinitas, California, in northern San Diego County. In July 2011, she served as grand marshal of the Cardiff Centennial Celebrations. Ross lived in Los Angeles, with her husband, actor Paul Michael, before his death.

Ross's two children also work in entertainment. Son Jim Meskimen's credits include How the Grinch Stole Christmas and appearances on Whose Line Is It Anyway? Marion and Jim have both acted in The Boondocks and Kung Fu Panda: Legends of Awesomeness (although not always in the same episodes). Daughter Ellen Plummer was a writer/producer on Friends.

Happy Days lawsuit
On April 19, 2011, Ross and four of her Happy Days co-stars, Erin Moran, Don Most, Anson Williams, and the estate of Tom Bosley filed a $10 million breach-of-contract lawsuit against CBS, which owns the show, claiming they had not been paid for merchandising revenue owed under their contracts. The cast members claimed they had not received revenue from show-related items, including comic books, T-shirts, scrapbooks, trading cards, games, lunch boxes, dolls, toy cars, magnets, greeting cards, and DVDs where their images appear on the box covers. Under their contracts, they were supposed to be paid five percent from the net proceeds of merchandising if their sole images were used, and half that amount if they were in a group. CBS said it owed the actors $8,500 and $9,000 each, most of it from slot machine revenue, but the group said they were owed millions. The lawsuit was initiated after Ross was informed, by a friend playing slots at a casino, of a Happy Days-themed machine on which players win the jackpot when five Marion Rosses are rolled.

In October 2011, a judge rejected the group's fraud claim, which rejects their claim to millions of dollars in potential damages. On June 5, 2012, a judge denied a motion filed by CBS to have the case thrown out, which meant it would go to trial on July 17 if the matter was not settled by then. In July 2012, the actors settled their lawsuit with CBS. Each received a payment of $65,000 and a promise by CBS to continue honoring the terms of their contracts.

Partial filmography

Video games
 SpongeBob SquarePants: Employee of the Month as Grandma SquarePants
 Madagascar: Escape 2 Africa as Nana

Book

References

External links

 

1928 births
Living people
Actresses from Minnesota
Actresses from San Diego
American film actresses
American musical theatre actresses
American voice actresses
American television actresses
American people of Canadian descent 
California Democrats
People from Watertown, Minnesota
San Diego State University alumni
Point Loma High School alumni
20th-century American actresses
21st-century American actresses
People from Albert Lea, Minnesota